Oeneis mongolica is a butterfly of the family Nymphalidae. It was described by Charles Oberthür in 1876. It is found in China, Mongolia and Korea.

Subspecies
Oeneis mongolica mongolica (north-eastern China, Inner Mongolia, Liaoning)
Oeneis mongolica coreana Matsumura, 1927 (North Korea)
Oeneis mongolica hallasanensis Murayama, 1991 (Korea: Cheju-do Island)
Oeneis mongolica hoenei Gross, 1970 (northern China: Shanxi)
Oeneis mongolica walkyria Fixsen, 1887 (central Korea)

References

 Oeneis mongolica at Insecta.pro

Butterflies described in 1876
Oeneis
Butterflies of Asia
Taxa named by Charles Oberthür